Chulpan Nailevna Khamatova PAR (born 1 October 1975) is a Russian film, theater and television actress.

Biography

Early life and theater career
Chulpan Nailevna Khamatova was born on 1 October 1975 in Kazan, Tatar ASSR, in what was then the Soviet Union. Her parents Marina Galimullovna Khamatova and Nail Khamatov are both engineers. Her name, Chulpan, means "morning star" (i.e. Venus) in Tatar (she is of Volga Tatar origin). Her younger brother  is also an actor.

As a child, she was engaged in figure skating and from the eighth grade studied at the mathematical school of the Kazan Federal University. She was accepted at the Kazan State Finance and Economics Institute but ended up changing her mind and entered the Kazan Theater School. Teachers Juno Kareva and Vadim Keshner, assessing the prospects of the beginning actress, advised and helped Khamatova continue her studies in Moscow, and she entered Russian Institute of Theatre Arts, the course of Alexei Borodin.

Khamatova performed on the stages of several Moscow theaters: Russian Academic Youth Theater (Dunya Raskolnikova in Crime and Punishment and Anne Frank in Anne Frank's Diary), the Theater of the Moon, the Anton Chekhov Theater (Katya in Pose of the Immigrant), the Open Theater Julia Malakyants (Silvia).

In 1998 she was invited to the troupe of the Moscow Sovremennik Theatre. She debuted in the role of Patricia Holman (Three Comrades by Erich Maria Remarque). She also received roles in the plays Three Sisters (Irina), Mamapapasynsobaka (Andria), The Storm (Katerina), The Naked Pioneer (Masha Mukhina) and Anthony and Cleopatra (Cleopatra), as well as the role of Masha in the new version of the play Three Sisters. In 2008, Khamatova took part in the performance of the Theatre of Nations Stories of Shukshin (directed by Alvis Hermanis), where she played nine of 10 stories.

Film career
Khamatova has starred in a number of German-language films, and she is considered to be a leading Russian actress.

In cinema, Khamatova started acting during the third year of GITIS – Vadim Abdrashitov invited her for the role of Katya in the film Time of a Dancer (1997). Khamatova's breakthrough came with the crime drama Country of the Deaf (1998) by Valery Todorovsky where she played Rita. The picture was about deaf-mute people and Khamatova had to learn sign language for the role.

Other notable films with Khamatova's participation include Bakhtiyar Khudoynazarov's picture Luna Papa (1999), 72 Meters (2004) and The Fall of the Empire (2005) by Vladimir Khotinenko, Children of the Arbat (2004) by Andrei Eshpai and Garpastum (2005) by Aleksei German Jr.

She is best known internationally for starring in Good Bye, Lenin! (2003), as Lara, the girlfriend of the main character and his mother's nurse.

She was on the six-person jury, which was headed by Catherine Deneuve, at the 63rd Venice International Film Festival in 2006.

In 2007, together with professional ice dancer Roman Kostomarov, she took part and became the winner of the Channel One figure skating competition Ice Age.

Personal life
Khamatova was married to the Russian actor and composer  from 1995 to 2002. In 2003, she dated ballet dancer Aleksei Dubinin. On 1 October 2009, she married Russian actor and director . She has three daughters: Arina Ivanovna Volkova (b. 4 April 2002), Asya Alekseievna Dubinina (b. 2003) and Iya Aleksandrovna Shein (b. 27 April 2010). Her marriage to Shein ended in 2017.

She is fluent in Russian, German, Portuguese and English.

Philanthropy and politics

Khamatova is known for her social activities, she draws public attention to the problems of children with cancer. In 2005, she and Dina Korzun organized the concert "Give me life" at the stage of Sovremennik Theatre to help children with hematological diseases. In 2006, Khamatova became a co-founder of the Podari Zhizn ("Make the gift of Life") charity foundation which helps children suffering from oncological and hematological diseases. By the summer of 2009, the fund had collected and sent for treatment of these diseases more than 500 million rubles. 

In 2012, Khamatova publicly supported Russian president Vladimir Putin during the presidential election campaign. According to Russian journalists, Khamatova was put under pressure to save her charity foundation. In 2019, Khamatova said that she would never have done that if she could imagine that he would start the war in Donbass. On another occasion, she said that she is actually apolitical, but the charity in Russia is heavily dependant on the support from the state.

In February 2022, Khamatova was one of signatories of the petition started by Mikhail Zygar to protest the 2022 Russian invasion of Ukraine. On holiday when the war started, she accepted that she needed to stay in exile in Latvia, realising that she could not return to Russia without being forced to deny the war or apologize for not supporting it. She stated that after she signed the petition, "it was made clear to me it would be undesirable for me to go back," adding "I know I am not a traitor. I love my motherland very much." In April 2022, she publicly spoke at an anti-war rally in the Latvian capital of Riga.

Filmography
 Country of the Deaf (1998)
 Time of a Dancer (1998)
 Luna Papa (1999)
 Tuvalu (1999)
 The Christmas Miracle (2000)
 England! (2000)
 Lion's Share (2001)
 Viktor Vogel - Commercial Man (2001)
 Good Bye, Lenin! (2003)
 Tamer of Chickens (2003)
 Hurensohn (2004)
 72 Meters (2004)
 Children of the Arbat (serial) (2004)
 Garpastum (2005)
 Greek Holidays (2005)
 The Fall of the Empire (2005)
 The Kukotsky Enigma (2005) serial
 Ellipsis (2006)
 Mechenosets (2006)
 Doctor Zhivago (2006 miniseries)
 Midsummer Madness (2007)
 América (2010)
 Tower (2010)
 House of the Sun (2010)
 Dostoevskiy (2011) (serial)
 Katya (2011) (short film) 
 From Tokyo (2011) (short film)
 Garegin Nzhdeh (2013) 
 Studio 17 (2013)
 The Syndrom of Petrushka (2015)
 Under Electric Clouds (2015)
 The White Crow (2018)
 The Bra (2018)
 VMayakovsky (2019)
 Doctor Lisa (2020)
 Petrov's Flu (2021)

Awards and honors 
 2001 – Award for best female role in the Viewers' View contest at the Kinotavar Film Festival (Lion's Share).
 2002 – Award for best female role (Luna Papa) at the Brigantina Film Festival.
 2002 – Viewer judgement panel award for best female role (Lunar Dad) at the Russian Sochi Film Festival.
 2003 – Chayka Award in the Smile nomination for best comedic female role 
 2004 – Russian Federation national award for performances in Anne Frank's Diary, Three Comrades and Mamapapasynsobaka.
 2004 – Awarded title of Honored Artist of the Russian Federation 
 2004 – Awarded the Golden Mask for role in Mamapapasynsobaka 
 2004 – Kumir Award 
 2006 – Coronation Award in the Brightest Star Category 
 2006 – TEFI Award in the Faces Category for best female role (Doctor Zhivago) 
 2006 – Golden Eagle Award for best female supporting role (Ellipsis)
 2006 – Friendship Award 
 2007 – George 2007 Award (in honor of George Melyes) from Russian Live Journal 
 2007 – Acknowledged by Glamour Magazine as Woman of the Year 
 2008 – Awarded a star on the Alley of Fame at the Russian Film Star Square 
 2009 – George 2007 Award (in honor of George Melyes) from Russian Live Journal 
 2009 – Living Theater Award for best female role in Shukshin's Tales
 2010 – Person of the Year 2009 Award in the nomination for Proactive Civil Initiative 
 2010 – In the Right Track Award in honor of V. Visotsky for years of work in the name of saving lives and helping preserve health in children, for asceticism, for spiritual generosity and for faith in humanity 
 2012 – Russian Federation National Artist Award for vast achievements in cinematography and theatrical arts 
 2012 – NIKA National Film Award for charitable work
 2012 – Asteroid 279119 Khamatova, discovered by Russian amateur astronomer Timur Krjačko at the Zelenchukskaya Station in 2009, was named in her honor. The official  was published by the Minor Planet Center on 28 December 2012.
 2015 – State Prize of the Russian Federation

Roles in theater
 1995 — «Young Robinson Dreams» O. Mikhailov (Pyatnitsa)
 1995 — «Fanta-Infanta» S. Prokhanov (Fanta)
 1996 — «The pose of the emigrant» G. Slutski (Katya)
 1997 — «Celebration» B. Slend (Sanny)
 1999 — «Three Comrades» E. M. Remarque (Patricia Holman) 
 2000 — «The Diary of Anne Frank» F. Gudrich, A. Hakket (Anne Frank)
 2001 — «Three Sisters» G. Volchek (Irina) 
 2003 — «Mamapapasinsobaka» («Mom & Dad & Son & Dog») B.Srblanovich (Andria)
 2003 — «Twelfth Night» Shakespeare (Perchtoldsdofer Sommerspiele, Austria) (Viola)
 2004 — «Thunderstorm» N. Chusova (Katerina)
 2005 — «Naked Pioneer Girl» M. Kononov (Mashsa)
 2006 — «Antony & Cleopatra. Version» O. Bogaev, K. Serebrennikov (Cleopatra)
 2008 — «Three Sisters» (Masha)
 2008 — «Shukshin Stories» A. Hermanis (9 roles)
 2009 — «Poor Liza» A. Sigalova, N. Simonov (Liza)
 2011 — «Miss Julie» T. Ostermeier (Julie)
 2011 — «Enemies: A Love Story» E. Arie (Mashsa)
 2012 — «Slightly Out of Focus» E. Arie (Sarah)

See also 
 Cinema of Russia
 Cinema of Germany
 List of Tatars

References

External links 
 

1975 births
Living people
Moscow State University alumni
Russian film actresses
Russian stage actresses
Russian television actresses
Tatar people of Russia
Actors from Kazan
Russian Academy of Theatre Arts alumni
State Prize of the Russian Federation laureates
People's Artists of Russia
Russian activists against the 2022 Russian invasion of Ukraine
Volga Tatar people
Members of the Civic Chamber of the Russian Federation
Academicians of the National Academy of Motion Picture Arts and Sciences of Russia